Bakso or baso is an Indonesian meatball, or a meat paste made from beef surimi. Its texture is similar to the Chinese beef ball, fish ball, or pork ball. The word bakso may refer to a single meatball or the complete dish of meatball soup. Mie bakso refers to bakso served with yellow noodles and rice vermicelli, while bakso kuah refers to bakso soup served without noodles.

Bakso can be found all across Indonesia, from street vendors to high-class restaurants. Along with soto, satay, and siomay, bakso is one of the most popular street foods in Indonesia. Today, various types of ready-to-cook bakso are also available as frozen foods sold in supermarkets in Indonesia. It is usually eaten with noodles.

Ingredients, contents, and serving

Bakso is commonly made from finely ground beef with a small quantity of tapioca flour and salt, however bakso can also be made from other ingredients, such as chicken, pork, fish or shrimp. Unlike other meatball recipes, bakso has a consistent firm, dense, homogeneous texture due to the polymerization of myosin in the beef surimi.

As most Indonesians are Muslims which observes halal dietary law, generally bakso is made from beef, chicken or the mixture of beef with chicken. While in non-Muslim majority areas, such as in Chinatowns in major cities and Hindu majority island of Bali, pork bakso might be found.

Traditionally the beef surimi paste or dough is made into balls by hand and boiled in hot water. After the meat is done, the meatballs are dried and served or refrigerated for later use. Pre-cooked bakso are usually displayed in the windows of street vendor carts.

Bakso are usually served in a bowl of beef broth, with yellow noodles, bihun (rice vermicelli), salted vegetables, tofu, egg (wrapped within bakso), Chinese broccoli, bean sprout, siomay or steamed meat dumpling, and crisp wonton, sprinkled with fried shallots and celery. Slices of bakso are often used and mixed as complements in mie goreng, nasi goreng, or cap cai recipes.

Origin

The name bakso originated from bak-so, the Hokkien pronunciation for "fluffy meat" or "minced meat". This suggests that bakso has Indonesian Chinese cuisine origin. Chinese influences is apparent in Indonesian food, such as bakmi, mie ayam, pangsit, mie goreng, kwetiau goreng, bakso, and lumpia. Indeed, bakso texture is quite similar to Chinese beef balls, which is quite fluffy and has homogenous texture. Although bakso has Chinese Hokkien origin name, culinary experts suggests that it is likely that bakso was the mixture of culinary influences back in colonial Dutch East Indies. Also in Indonesian, the term bola daging is often refers to Western or European style of meatballs, which is different in texture and elasticity compared to bakso. For example, Swedish meatballs are translated as bola daging Swedia in Indonesian. The soup and the noodles probably originated in China, but the meatball, may have come from the Dutch, who colonized Indonesia in the 19th century.

Despite its possible Chinese origin, bakso seems to had undergone localization, especially into Chinese Indonesian and Javanese cuisine. Today, most of the bakso vendors are native Javanese from Wonogiri (a town near Solo) and Malang. Bakso Solo and Bakso Malang are the most popular variant; the name comes from the city it comes from, Solo in Central Java and Malang in East Java. Bakso Solo is usually served with yellow noodle and rice vermicelli in beef broth, while Bakso Malang usually is enrichen with tofu and crispy fried wonton. In Malang, bakso bakar (roasted bakso) is also popular. 
 
In Bandung, West Java, there is a type of bakso called bakso cuanki, which is quite similar with bakso Malang. 
It can contains various type of bakso ingredients; such as bakso aci, siomay dumpling, boiled wonton, fried wonton, fried bakso, served with scallion and broth soup.

Variations

Indonesia has developed numerous bakso variants, usually differing in shape, size, texture, ingredients, and fillings.

 Bakso aci: meatball with more tapioca content
 Bakso ayam: chicken bakso
 Bakso babi: pork meatball
 Bakso bakar: grilled and skewered bakso, prepared in a similar fashion to satay
 Bakso beranak: big meatball filled with small meatballs
 Bakso bola tenis tennis ball-sized bakso, either filled with hard boiled egg as bakso telur or filled with tetelan which includes pieces of spare beef meat and fat or urat (tendon).
 Bakso cuanki: a famous bakso in Bandung, West Java
 Bakso gepeng: flat beef bakso, it usually has finer and more homogenous texture
 Bakso goreng: fried bakso with a rather hard texture, usually consumed solely as a snack or mixed in one bowl as part of bakso Malang or bakso cuanki
 Bakso ikan: fish bakso (fish ball)
 Bakso keju: a modern variant of bakso, filled with either cheddar or mozarella cheese
 Bakso kotak: cube-shaped bakso
 Bakso Malang: bakso dish from the city of Malang in East Java; complete with noodles, tofu, siomay, and fried wontons
 Bakso mercon: lit. "fire cracker bakso", refer to an extra hot and spicy bakso filled with sambal made of chilli pepper and birds eye chili pepper
 Bakso tahu: bakso meat dough filled into tofu
 Bakso telur: a tennis ball-sized bakso with hard boiled chicken egg wrapped inside
 Bakso udang: shrimp bakso with a slightly pink color
 Bakso urat: bakso filled with tendons and coarse meat

Condiments

Bakso stalls usually served bottles of sauces, condiments, additions and garnishing. Clients may add these condiments according to their personal preferences. The following condiments and accompaniments are often added upon a bowl of bakso:
 Bawang goreng crisp fried shallot sprinkled upon bakso
 Kecap manis or sweet soy sauce, to add mild sweetness
 Sambal chili paste to add spiciness
 Bottled hot sauce
 Ketchup tomato sauce
 Vinegar to add sourness
 Tongcay preserved salted vegetables

Popularity

Bakso is one of the most popular street foods in Indonesian cities and villages alike. Travelling street vendors, either by carts or bikes are often frequenting residential areas in Indonesia, while bakso warung and humble tent food stalls are often sprung on street sides in Indonesian cities. Bakso came to international attention when the United States President Barack Obama remembered it as one of his favourite foods from his childhood in Indonesia, and mentioned it in his speech. It was also part of a task in The Amazing Race Asia 1, The Amazing Race Australia 1 and The Amazing Race 28 where teams had to either sell and/or eat bakso.

The traveling meatball vendor is often associated with intelligence undercover activity. On social media there are also many memes depicting meatball vendors communicating through walkie-talkies. According to Ridlwan Habib, an intelligence observer, the profession of mobile food traders such as meatball workers is often used by members of the Detective or Densus 88 to spy on terrorist activities or other suspicious criminal activities.

Similar dishes
Similar meatball dishes can be found in other Southeast Asian cuisines, such as those in Thailand, Vietnam, Malaysia, and Singapore, as well as Chinese-style meatballs.

The dish also similar with Vietnamese noodle soup with meatballs, phở bò viên. In Vietnam, Phở means noodle soup while Bò Viên is meatballs. Phở Bò Viên is one of version of Pho dish in Vietnam. It has been considered as the national dish of Vietnam.

In Malaysia and Singapore, there is a similar meatball soup called bebola daging, which actually a Malay translation of "meatball". Many recipe of bebola daging in Malaysia and Singapore are actually derived from either Western (Indian or European) and Eastern (Chinese) meatballs, such as bebola daging Masala which is derived from Indian cuisine influence.

In the Philippines, meatballs are called almondigas or bola-bola, and are usually served in a misua noodle soup with toasted garlic, squash, and pork cracklings. Bola-bolas are also stewed or pan-fried until golden brown.

Health issue

In the past, borax and formalin is often added into beef surimi mixture in order to preserve the produced bakso, also to make bakso more chewy (from borax induced myosin cross-linking) with less usage of meat. As a result, bakso is often listed by Indonesian Food and Drug Administration as an unhealthy foodstuff. The country's Directorate of Consumer Protection warns of the risk of liver cancer caused by high consumption over a period of 5–10 years. The government issued Sodium tripolyphosphate as borax substitute. Today's bakso, frozen bakso being sold at supermarkets and traditional markets in Indonesia are borax free.

See also

 Chinese Indonesian cuisine
 List of meatball dishes
 Mie ayam
 Mie bakso
 Mie kocok
 Swedish meatballs

References

Indonesian Chinese cuisine
Meatballs
Street food in Indonesia
Indonesian beef dishes